Michael Lucas (born Michael Lukac; March 7, 1926 — May 4, 2020) was an artist, designer and political activist based in Toronto, Ontario. He was the Chair of the executive committee of the Canadian Friends of Soviet People, founded in 1991, and was formerly the chair of the USSR-Canada Friendship Association from 1972 until 1991. He was also the chair of the International Council of Friendship and Solidarity with Soviet People, operating out of Toronto. He was also a longtime leader of the Carpatho-Russian Society and was a longtime member of the Communist Party of Canada since his youth. He was also editor-in-chief of the  Northstar Compass, the monthly magazine, published from 1991 until 2017, first by the Canadian Friends of Soviet People and then by the International Council of Friendship with Soviet People.

Lucas was born in Vyšná Jablonka in the Carpathian Mountains of eastern Slovakia, and came to Canada as a child in 1938 to join his father, who had emigrated several years before to work in the nickel mines in Sudbury, Ontario, and become a union activist. The reunited family settled there initially before moving to Toronto.

Later, Lucas attended what is now the Ontario College of Art and Design and pursued a career in graphic design. In his professional life, Lucas was at various times the art director of CFTO-TV in Toronto, the director of the art department at Southam Newspapers, and led artistic and design teams at various advertising agencies.

Lucas visited Czechoslovakia and the Soviet Union many times in his life. He was in Czechoslovakia during the Soviet invasion that ended the Prague Spring and vocally supported Moscow's intervention upon his return to Canada.

Lucas died in Canada at the age of 94. He is survived by his wife Helen Lucas, the financial secretary of Canadian Friends of Soviet Peoples and two children.

See also
Vic Ratsma
Ray Stevenson
Dyson Carter

References

External links
Northstar Compass
We Wish Happy 80th Birthday to Michael Lucas

1926 births
2020 deaths
Members of the Communist Party of Canada
Czechoslovak emigrants to Canada
Canadian people of Slovak descent
Naturalized citizens of Canada
Rusyn people
People from Humenné District